Kube Cake, also known as Kube Toffee, is a Ghanaian locally made candy.

Ingredient 
Ingredients used in preparation include Coconut, Sugar, Water and Lemon Juice.

Preparation 
In preparing the candy the sugar is first heated until it becomes brown then the grated coconut, which has been dried, and then the lemon is added to flavor it. Pour it on a flat surface and start moulding it into small round crunchy candies.

References

External links 
 How to make Kube Cake.

Ghanaian cuisine
African cuisine
Snack foods
Candy